The men's 800 metres event at the 1989 Summer Universiade was held at the Wedaustadion in Duisburg with the final on 28 August 1989.

Medalists

Results

Heats

Semifinals

Final
Held on 30 August

References

Athletics at the 1989 Summer Universiade
1989